The pale blue flycatcher (Cyornis unicolor) is a bird in the family Muscicapidae. The species was first described by Edward Blyth in 1843.

It is found in Bangladesh, Bhutan, Brunei, Cambodia, China, Hong Kong, India, Indonesia, Laos, Malaysia, Myanmar, Nepal, Thailand, and Vietnam. Its natural habitats are subtropical or tropical moist lowland forest and subtropical or tropical moist montane forest.

It is superficially similar in appearance to the verditer flycatcher, but is paler blue, with greyish underparts from throat to vent, and a discontinuous black eye-patch. Both birds can often be found in the same locale.

Gallery

References

pale blue flycatcher
Birds of Eastern Himalaya
Birds of South China
Birds of Southeast Asia
pale blue flycatcher
pale blue flycatcher
Taxonomy articles created by Polbot